Philip Chok is a former Hong Kong international lawn and indoor bowler.

Chok won a gold medal in the fours at both the 1980 World Outdoor Bowls Championship in Melbourne and the 1978 Commonwealth Games in Edmonton. He also finished runner-up to the legendary David Bryant in the 1980 World Indoor Bowls Championship.

Chok was one of the founders of the Hong Kong International Bowls Classic in which he won the 1983 & 1984 Hong Kong International Bowls Classic pairs titles.

References

Hong Kong male bowls players
Commonwealth Games medallists in lawn bowls
Bowls World Champions
Commonwealth Games gold medallists for Hong Kong
Bowls players at the 1978 Commonwealth Games
Medallists at the 1978 Commonwealth Games